Zhenya Gay (born Eleanor Byrnes) (1906–1978) was an American writer and illustrator.

Biography 
Eleanor Barnes was born in 1906 in Norwood, Massachusetts and, died August 3, 1978. She attended Columbia University, where she studied with Solon Borglum and Winold Reiss.

Her first artistic jobs as a freelancer were creating movie posters, newspaper advertisements, and costume designs for theater productions.

She spent several years traveling and living in Europe, Mexico, and Central America. In 1954, she left New York City for the Catskill Mountains.

She was in a relationship with Jan Gay (born Helen Reitman, daughter of Ben Reitman), a children's book writer.

In addition to her book illustrations, Gay also created standalone artworks, including aquatints, lithographs, and etchings. Her works are held in the permanent collections of several museums, including the University of Michigan Museum of Art, the Fine Arts Museums of San Francisco, and the Seattle Art Museum.

The Kerlan Collection at the University of Minnesota holds much of her work, as does the de Grummond Children's Literature Collection at the University of Southern Mississippi.

Gay died on August 3, 1978.

Selected works 
 Pancho and His Burro, 1930
 The Shire Colt, 1931
 Sakimura, 1936
 Whistlers' Van, 1937
 The Ballad of Reading Gaol by Oscar Wilde, 1937
 Manuelito of Costa Rica, 1940
 Look!, 1952
 Jingle Jangle Story, 1953
 The Major and His Camels by Miriam E. Mason. Macmillan, 1953.
 The Sugarbush Family by Miriam E. Mason. Macmillan, 1954.
 Wonderful Things, 1954
 The Dear Friends, 1959
 I'm Tired of Lions, 1961
 Who's Afraid?, 1965

References 

20th-century American women writers
20th-century American women artists
Artists from Massachusetts
American women illustrators
American children's writers
Writers from Massachusetts
People from Norwood, Massachusetts
1906 births
1978 deaths
Women children's writers